Joachim Wilhelm von Brawe (4 February 1738 – 7 April 1758) was a German poet from Weißenfels.

Biography 
From 1755 to 1758, Brawe studied law at the University of Leipzig. Having successfully contended, in his 18th year, for a dramatic prize, he felt animated to persevere, particularly under the encouragement of Lessing and Weiße, and produced his tragedy of "Brutus," which proved very successful. He was cut off by the small-pox, in the twentieth year of his age. He died in Dresden while paying a visit to his father.

Bibliography 
Der Freygeist. (= The Free-thinker.) Leipzig 2002. .

1738 births
1758 deaths
People from Weißenfels
People from Saxe-Weissenfels
German poets
Writers from Saxony-Anhalt
German male poets